Józef Wojciech Błaszczyk (born 23 March 1947, in Gdynia) is a sailor from Poland. Błaszczyk represented his country at the 1972 Summer Olympics in Kiel. Błaszczyk took 8th place in the Soling with Zygfryd Perlicki as helmsman and Stanisław Stefański as fellow crew member.

References

Living people
1947 births
Sportspeople from Gdynia
Polish male sailors (sport)
Sailors at the 1972 Summer Olympics – Soling
Olympic sailors of Poland